Brimus spinipennis is a species of beetle in the family Cerambycidae. It was described by Francis Polkinghorne Pascoe in 1858. It is known from the South African Republic.

References

Phrissomini
Beetles described in 1858